The Tiger's Tail is a 2006 Irish film written and directed by John Boorman and starring Brendan Gleeson and Kim Cattrall. The story focuses on the modern Celtic Tiger Irish economy of the late 20th century. The film premiered at the 2006 San Sebastián Film Festival.

Plot
Liam O'Leary (Gleeson) is a successful real estate developer in Dublin.  He lives in a magnificent house with his unhappy wife (Cattrall) and rebellious son.  One day, his pleasant life takes a dramatic downturn. The city council turns down his request to build a stadium, toward which he has taken out cripplingly large bank loans, and a doppelgänger, with his identical body and facial features, begins appearing around town, ordering suits and automobiles on Liam's credit account and behaving in a scandalous manner. Liam desperately attempts to pull his life out of its tailspin, but he must return to his dirtpoor roots and the old friends he has long abandoned to find the answers.

Characters
 Brendan Gleeson as Liam O'Leary
 Kim Cattrall as Jane O'Leary
 Ciarán Hinds as Father Andy
 Sinéad Cusack as Oona O'Leary
 Sean McGinley as Declan Murray
 Angeline Ball as Ursula
 Cathy Belton as Sally

References

External links
 
 

2006 films
Irish drama films
Films directed by John Boorman
Films set in Dublin (city)
2000s mystery films
Irish thriller films
Irish mystery films
2000s mystery thriller films
2006 thriller drama films
Films about con artists
Films about identity theft
2006 drama films
2000s English-language films